St Helens Metropolitan Borough Council elections are held every four years. St Helens Metropolitan Borough Council, which styles itself St Helens Borough Council, is the local authority for the metropolitan borough of St Helens in Merseyside, England. Since the last boundary changes in 2022, 48 councillors have been elected from 18 wards. Prior to the 2022 boundary changes, elections were held three years out of every four, with a third of the council being elected each time.

Political control
From 1889 to 1974 St Helens was a county borough, independent of any county council. Under the Local Government Act 1972 it had its territory enlarged and became a metropolitan borough, with Merseyside County Council providing county-level services. The first election to the reconstituted borough council was held in 1973, initially operating as a shadow authority before coming into its revised powers on 1 April 1974. Merseyside County Council was abolished in 1986 and St Helens became a unitary authority. Political control of the council since 1973 has been held by the following parties:

Leadership
The leaders of the council since 1974 have been:

Council elections
Summary of the council composition after each council election, click on the year for full details of each election.

‡Includes Liberal Party and Social Democratic Party pre-1988.

Borough result maps

By-election results
By-elections occur when seats become vacant between council elections. Below is a summary of recent by-elections; full by-election results can be found by clicking on the by-election name.

References

External links
St Helens Borough Council

 
Council elections in Merseyside